Coriaria nepalensis is a shrub of the genus Coriaria. It grows in the foot hills of Himalayas. It blooms in spring and has bright yellow flowers and red fruits in summer.

The plant is also known in English as masuri berry, tanner's tree, or mansur shrub. In Hindi it is known as masuri, makola, or masurya; and in Nepali as macchaino.

Description
C. nepalensis is a shrub, growing around 1.5-2.5 metres tall. Flowers, yellow in colour, are in groups (inflorescences) and they are male or female but in the same plant. It blooms from February to May.

Fruits are red to dark purple when mature. They resemble berries, but they are actually achenes protected by enlarged and colored petals. The fruits are produced from May to August, but they are inedible as their seeds are poisonous.

The number of chromosomes the plant has is 40.

Distribution 
C. nepalensis grows on the southern slopes of the Himalayas (in Bhutan, India, Nepal, Pakistan), usually between 800 and 2500 metres.

This species was also found in southern China in mountain slopes at 200–3200 m high. It has been found in the Chinese provinces of Gansu, Guangxi, Guizhou, Henan, Hong Kong, Hubei, Hunan, Jiangsu, Shaanxi, Sichuan, Xizang, Yunnan.

References

External links

 The Biodiversity of the Hengduan Mountains Project

Coriariaceae
Shrubs
Flora of Gansu
Flora of Guangxi
Flora of Guizhou
Flora of Henan
Flora of Hong Kong
Flora of Hubei
Flora of Hunan
Flora of Jiangsu
Flora of Shaanxi
Flora of Sichuan
Flora of Tibet
Flora of Yunnan
Plants described in 1832